This page provides the summaries of the matches of the qualifying rounds for the Football at the 1980 Summer Olympics to be held in Moscow. In the end tree countries qualified.

Qualifying rounds

First round

|}

Libya won 3–1 on aggregate and advanced to the second round.

Algeria won 4–2 on penalties after 1–1 on aggregate and advanced to the second round.

Morocco won 6–5 on penalties after 1–1 on aggregate and advanced to the second round.

Lesotho won 7–3 on aggregate and advanced to the second round.

Madagascar won 3–2 on aggregate and advanced to the second round.

Egypt advanced to the second round, Tanzania withdrew.

Kenya advanced to the second round, Sudan withdrew.

Liberia advanced to the second round, Ivory Coast withdrew.

Sierra Leone advanced to the second round, Guinea withdrew.

Second round

|}

Liberia advanced to the third round, Sierra Leone withdrew in the second leg.

Ghana won 5–0 on aggregate and advanced to the third round.

Algeria won 8–1 on aggregate and advanced to the third round.

Zambia won 5–0 on aggregate and advanced to the third round.

Egypt won 4–3 on penalties after 2–2 on aggregate and advanced to the third round.

Third round

|}

Egypt won 5–2 and qualified for the 1980 Summer Olympics football tournament.

Ghana won 4–2 and qualified for the 1980 Summer Olympics football tournament.

Algeria qualified for the 1980 Summer Olympics football tournament, Libya withdrew.

Note: Due to the American-led political boycott, two countries Egypt and Ghana who qualified did not enter the Final Tournament and were replaced respectively by Zambia and Nigeria which participated with Algeria.

References

External links
 Football Qualifying Tournament (Moscow, Soviet Union, 1980) - Zone Africa - rsssf.com

Africa
Football at the Summer Olympics – Men's African Qualifiers